Guta (Iguta), known as Naraguta(wa) in Hausa, is a Kainji language of Nigeria.

References

Further reading
A Sociolinguistic Profile of the Iguta (nar) Language of Plateau State, Nigeria

East Kainji languages
Languages of Nigeria